BNL may refer to:

Entertainment
 Banjo Newsletter, a magazine devoted to the 5-string banjo
 Barenaked Ladies, a rock band from Canada
 Basketball National League, South Africa's top basketball division
 British National League (disambiguation), two former ice hockey leagues
 Buy n Large, a fictional company featured in the movie WALL-E

Organisations
 Banca Nazionale del Lavoro, an Italian bank
 Brookhaven National Laboratory, New York, US

Other
 Block nested loop, an algorithm in computing